Krock or variant thereof may refer to:

People
 Arthur Krock (1886-1974), U.S. journalist
 Gus Krock (1866-1905), U.S. baseball player
 Hendrick Krock (1671-1738), Danish painter

Other uses
 K-Rock (radio station), a common radio brand which refers to a number of rock music radio stations
 Rogers K-Rock Centre, arena in Kingston, Ontario, Canada

See also
 Crock (disambiguation)
 Kroc, surname
 KROC (disambiguation)
 Krok (disambiguation)